Panderiidae is a family of trilobites in the order Corynexochida.

These nektobenthic carnivores lived in the Ordovician period, from 488.3  to 443.7 Ma.

Genera
Hemibarrandia
Panderia

Distribution
Fossils of this genus have been found in the Ordovician sediments of Czech Republic, France, Norway, Spain, Sweden and United Kingdom.

References 

Ordovician trilobites
Illaenina
Trilobite families